"Accident Prone" is a single released by the British Rock band Status Quo in 1978. It was included on the album If You Can't Stand the Heat. The title was rather prophetic, for it was their only official single of the 1970s in Britain to fail to reach the Top 30.

Track listing 
 "Accident Prone" (Williams/Hutchins) (4.08)
 "Let Me Fly" (Rossi/Frost) (4.20)

Charts

References 

Status Quo (band) songs
1978 singles
Songs written by Pip Williams
Song recordings produced by Pip Williams
1978 songs
Vertigo Records singles